Grace May Cassidy (born 24 March 1993) is an English actress. She began her career as a child actress in the BBC One drama The Chase (2006–2007), the CBBC series Grange Hill (2007–2008), and the ITV soap opera Emmerdale (2009–2012).

Early life and education
Cassidy was born in Salford. She is the older sister of actress Raffey Cassidy, who portrayed Athena in Tomorrowland. Cassidy joined the National Youth Theatre. She graduated with a Bachelor of Arts in Drama and Theatre Arts from Goldsmiths, University of London in 2019. She then trained at the Royal Academy of Dramatic Art (RADA), graduating in 2021 with a Master of Arts in the Theatre Lab programme.

Career
Cassidy's most notable role so far is that of Rachel Towers in BBC children's drama Grange Hill, but she has had a number of smaller roles in multiple television series of the past few years, including The Street, The Chase and Marian, Again. Cassidy also had a guest spot in Casualty 1909, spin-off of the drama series Casualty, appearing in this occasion alongside her real-life brother Mossie Cassidy in his first TV role.

Cassidy portrayed Matty Barton (Ash Palmisciano) in Emmerdale prior to his transition when still going by "Hannah", with her first appearance in the soap being 17 July 2009. On 28 April 2012, Cassidy confirmed her departure from Emmerdale.

Filmography

Film

Television

References

External links
 
 Grace Cassidy Online
 Grace Cassidy at Spotlight

Living people
1993 births
21st-century English actresses
Alumni of Goldsmiths, University of London
Alumni of RADA
English television actresses
English soap opera actresses
Actresses from Salford